Hoyte van Hoytema (born 4 October 1971) is a Swiss-born Dutch-Swedish cinematographer who studied at the National Film School in Łódź. His work includes Let the Right One In (2008), The Fighter (2010), Tinker Tailor Soldier Spy (2011), Her (2013), the James Bond film Spectre (2015), Ad Astra (2019), and Nope (2022). Van Hoytema is also known for his collaborations with director Christopher Nolan, having shot Interstellar (2014), Dunkirk (2017),  Tenet (2020), and the upcoming film Oppenheimer (2023). His work has been highly praised by film critics and audiences alike and has earned him multiple awards, including one Academy Award nomination and three BAFTA Award nominations for Best Cinematography.

Career 
Van Hoytema has shot several feature films, documentaries, and successful television series. His collaborations with directors Mikael Marcimain, Tomas Alfredson, and Christopher Nolan have won him critical acclaim and several national and international prizes.

He is a member of the American Society of Cinematographers, Swedish Society of Cinematographers, and the Netherlands Society of Cinematographers.

Personal life 
Van Hoytema was born to Dutch parents in Horgen, Zürich, Switzerland. Of his nationality, Hoytema stated "I'm not really affiliated with Switzerland, I'm born there, that is all. My parents were there very briefly. They are both from Holland. I'm Dutch, but it has been over 20 years since I was in Holland. What has been important for my career has taken place in Sweden. I have a Swedish wife and a Swedish daughter, and I feel adopted by Sweden. I feel most connected to Sweden."

Filmography 
Film

Television

Other roles

Awards and nominations

References

External links 
 

1971 births
Best Cinematographer Guldbagge Award winners
Dutch cinematographers
Dutch emigrants to Sweden
Dutch film producers
Dutch people of Polish-Jewish descent
Living people
People from Horgen
Swedish cinematographers